The Titovka was a famous green side cap characteristic of the Yugoslav Partisans during World War II, and later the Yugoslav People's Army (JNA), hence known as the JNA cap.  It was based on the Russian pilotka, and often had the red star badge on the front, either made out of red felt or an enamelled red star with hammer and sickle. It was named after the Partisan leader and President of Yugoslavia, Marshal Josip Broz Tito, and used by the Union of Pioneers of Yugoslavia, in white or blue colour.

See also
Triglavka, Partisan cap
Šajkača, Serbian cap
Forage cap, similar styles
Kozarčanka

References

Yugoslav Partisans
Military uniforms
Caps